Velestovo is a village situated on the slopes of Galičica Mountain in Ohrid Municipality, North Macedonia. It is located roughly 4 kilometres from the town of Ohrid.

Demographics
According to the statistics of the Bulgarian ethnographer Vasil Kanchov from 1900, 560 inhabitants lived in Velestovo, all Bulgarian Exarchists. 

As of the 2021 census, Velestovo had 889 residents with the following ethnic composition:
Macedonians 855
Persons for whom data are taken from administrative sources 29
Others 5

According to the 2002 census, the village had a total of 53 inhabitants. Ethnic groups in the village include:
Macedonians 53

Churches
Dormition of the Theotokos Church - from the 15th century
Holy Trinity Church - the main church of Velestovo Monastery

People
Slave Ǵorǵo Dimoski (b. 1959) - poet
Dubravka Kiselički -actress

Events
Poetry night at Velestovo (Поетска ноќ во Велестово) - Traditional poetry festival since 1989
Ǵomlezijada - food festival of traditional Ohrid's food Ǵomleze
Fine Arts Colony

Accommodation
Villa Velestovo - Apartments in Velestovo
Velestovo House - Apartments in Velestovo

References

Villages in Ohrid Municipality